The Ernest A. Calling House is a historic house in Gothenburg, Nebraska. It was built by L. J. Anderson in 1907 for Ernest A. Calling, an immigrant from Sweden who first arrived in the United States in 1889, became a businessman in Gothenburg, and died in 1945. It was designed in the Queen Anne style. It has been listed on the National Register of Historic Places since October 25, 1979.

References

National Register of Historic Places in Dawson County, Nebraska
Queen Anne architecture in Nebraska
Houses completed in 1907
1907 establishments in Nebraska